Glenquarry is a locality in the Southern Highlands of New South Wales, Australia, in Wingecarribee Shire. It is a scattered village on the banks of the Wingecarribee River.

Population
According to the 2021 census, there were 261 people living at Glenquarry.

References

Towns of the Southern Highlands (New South Wales)